Samuel Theis (born 12 November 1978) is a French actor, film director and screenwriter. He was awarded the Camera d'Or prize along with Claire Burger and Marie Amachoukeli for directing the film Party Girl at the 2014 Cannes Film Festival.

Filmography

Actor

Director

References

External links

1978 births
Living people
French film directors
21st-century French male actors
French male television actors
French male film actors
French male screenwriters
French screenwriters
People from Forbach
Directors of Caméra d'Or winners